HTB may refer to:

 Havic: The Bothering, a parody card game
 Heat loss due to linear thermal bridging (HTB)
 Hierarchical token bucket, a computer networking algorithm
 Holy Trinity Brompton, a church in London, England
 Hokkaido Television Broadcasting, in Japan
 Household Troops Band of the Salvation Army

See also 
 NTV (disambiguation) (Cyrillic: HTB)